The 4925th Test Group is an inactive United States Air Force unit. Its last was assigned to the 4901st Support  Wing (Atomic), stationed at Kirtland Air Force Base, New Mexico.  It was inactivated on 31 August 1961. Known as "The Megaton Blasters", the 4925th was responsible for the development flight testing of all USAF nuclear weapon delivery systems including conducting live test drops from 1951 though 1958.  The Group was discontinued on April 1, 1961, when Air Force Systems Command replaced Air Research and Development Command and components of its mission were distributed among other units.

History
Established in 1948 as the 3170th Special Weapons Group following a decision to consolidate all USAF special weapons activities under AF Special Weapons Command.  Was tasked with testing all aircraft in the United States inventory for nuclear weapons delivery capability.

Its overall mission was specifically to:

 Marry all nuclear weapon types to all suitable types of aircraft
 Establish the ballistics of each type of nuclear weapon on precision bomb ranges
 Support the Atomic Energy Commission (AEC) with live test drops at Nevada and in the Pacific
 Fly through and “sample” highly radioactive nuclear “clouds” after explosions at those test drops and collect atmospheric samples of nuclear materiel.

The group also recommended military characteristics and requirements for special weapons, provided facilities for training programs, and maintained an instrumentation laboratory and a technical liaison with the Armed Forces Special Weapons Project (AFSWP), AEC, and others.  The top bomber and fighter pilots in the USAF and expert support personnel were transferred to the 4925th Special Weapons Group. These included bomber, fighter, and helicopter pilots; bombardiers; nuclear project engineers; depot level modification personnel; aerial cameramen; and crew chiefs and crews. Each had to have AEC “Q” clearance, a background check by the Federal Bureau of Investigation [FBI] that went back 15 years.

The group was established within a double-barbed-wire-fence complex dubbed “Area Charlie” with a small sign on the gate reading “Santa Fe Operations”. In July 1951, the 4925th Special Weapons Group was redesignated the 4925th Test Group
(Atomic) and continued as an important component of KAFB’s nuclear responsibilities.

During the early 1950s the 4925th Test Group (Atomic) participated in the majority of atmospheric nuclear tests, both in the Pacific and in Nevada.  The group completed nuclear live drops at both the Nevada and Pacific test complexes and ballistic drops, or duplicates of the real thing, at the Edwards AFB Precision Bomb Range, the AEC Salton Sea Precision Bomb Range in southeastern California, and the Low Altitude Bombing System (LABS) Bomb Range near Edwards AFB. The 4925th Test Group (Atomic) also participated in drops at the Navy Auxiliary Air Station Bomb Range, California, Tonopah Bomb Range, Nevada, White Sands Missile Range, New Mexico (Hardison 1990), and at KAFB’s Practice Bomb Range on Isleta
Pueblo, New Mexico.

The group participated in AFSWC Development Directorate investigated projects such as adding a parachute to a bomb to delay delivery, which allowed for the combat crew to release the bomb and escape before it exploded. The goal of one of the early lay-down projects was to determine the feasibility of delivering a parachute-retarded thermonuclear weapon weighing more than 40,000 pounds, the heaviest nuclear weapons in the stockpile, from altitudes exceeding 40,000 feet. One early effort was the development of a system that could retard the fall of either a TX-14 or a TX-16 weapon, heavy airburst bombs, from altitudes of 40,000 feet to 4,000 feet in 167 seconds from a B-36 Peacemaker.

In 1956, however, AFSWC was directed to establish a permanent USAF Air Task Group for atmospheric tests. Thus, in 1956, the 4950th Test Group (Nuclear) was created, holding equal stature to the 4925th Test Group (Atomic). At that point, the atmospheric test participation of the 4925th Test Group (Atomic) was cut back and the group focused on the aircraft/weapon marriage mission.  The group evaluated equipment for the installation of special weapons into aircraft.
This included sway braces, bomb suspension and control systems, pylons and racks, handling and loading equipment, and control and monitor apparatus.

During 1956 the 4925th Test Group (Atomic) worked on equipment testing to provide single Mk-15 and Mk-21 capabilities for the B-52. Both configurations were in use by the end of 1956, and successful flight and drop tests continued into February 1957. The group also began testing the TX-28 with the swept-wing F-84F “Thunderstreak.” Aircraft modifications included pylon and weapon loading and compatibility, proper functioning of the units, clearances, and complete electrical checks of the special weapons control. Flights determined aerodynamic loads, vibration, stability and control affects in straight and level, flight dive and LABS maneuvers. A new technological innovation in the early 1950s, LABS was a component of the flight control system; it controlled an aircraft automatically during low-altitude bombing. These test
maneuvers were made at various true airspeeds, altitudes, and release and dive angles.

In 1957, AFSWC, including the 4925th Test Group (Atomic), assisted the ADC with the loading of the first operational Genie rocket onto F-89J “Scorpion” aircraft (Greene et al. 1957). The F-89J was the aircraft used for the live test fire of the Genie rocket at the Nevada Test Site and became the ADC’s first fighter-interceptor to carry nuclear armament. Other aircraft tested by the 4925th Test Group (Atomic) included B-29, B-50D Superfortress, B-36H Peacemaker, B-45,
B-47 Stratojet, B-57, and B-66 bombers. These were paired with fission and thermonuclear bombs, both established and those in development.

In 1956, the 4950th Test Group (Nuclear) took responsibility for the 4926th Test Squadron (Sampling).  In 1960, the 4926th Test Squadron (Sampling) moved from the 4950th Test Group (Nuclear) and consolidated with other organizations into the 4925th Test Group (Atomic).

Inactivated in 1961 after 1958 moratorium of atmospheric nuclear testing.

Lineage
 Established as 3170th Special Weapons Group and activated on 28 August 1948
 Re-designated: 4925th Special Weapons Group, 1949
 Re-designated: 4925th Test Group (Atomic), 1 July 1951
 Inactivated on: 31 August 1961

Assignments
 Air Force Special Weapons Command, 28 August 1948
 4901st Support Wing (Atomic), 1 July 1951 – 31 August 1961

Components
 4926th Test Squadron, 19 September 1953 – 1956; 1960-1961 (Nuclear test atmospheric sampling)
 4927th Test Squadron 1 September 1953 – 22 September 1958 (Tactical aircraft nuclear weapon delivery tests)
 Assigned four each of the following aircraft during activation period:  F-84F, F-86E, F-101A
 4928th Test Squadron 1 September 1953 – 22 September 1958 (Strategic bomber nuclear weapon delivery tests)
 Assigned four each of the following aircraft during activation period: B-29, B-50D, B-36H, B-45A, B-47D, B-57A, B-66B and B-52C
 Provided B-36 and B-52 drop airplanes for all US air-launched nuclear tests in Nevada and the Pacific from 1951 to 1958.
 4929th Test Squadron 1 September 1953 – 22 September 1958 (Non-flying photographic support)

Stations
 Kirtland AFB, New Mexico, 1948 – 31 August 1961

References

 Mueller, Robert. Air Force Bases Volume I: Active Air Force Bases Within the United States of America on 17 September 1982. Office of Air Force History, 1989.

Test groups of the United States Air Force
Four digit groups of the United States Air Force
Nuclear weapons program of the United States
Military units and formations disestablished in 1961